Sainte-Edwidge-de-Clifton is a township municipality in the Canadian province of Quebec, located within the Coaticook Regional County Municipality. The township had a population of 504 in the Canada 2016 Census.

Demographics 

Population trend:

References

External links

Township municipalities in Quebec
Incorporated places in Estrie
Coaticook Regional County Municipality